Danese is an unincorporated community in Fayette County, West Virginia, United States. Danese has a post office with ZIP code 25831.

Danese was originally called Noel; the present name is after the daughter of a settler.

References

Unincorporated communities in Fayette County, West Virginia
Unincorporated communities in West Virginia